The 1996–97 Danish 1st Division season was the 52nd season of the Danish 1st Division league championship and the 11th consecutive as a second tier competition governed by the Danish Football Association.

The division-champion and runner-up promoted to the 1997–98 Danish Superliga. The teams in the 13th to 16th spots relegated to the 1997–98 Danish 2nd Division.

Table

Top goalscorers

See also
 1996–97 in Danish football
 1996–97 Danish Superliga

External links
 Peders Fodboldstatistik

Danish 1st Division seasons
Denmark
2